Anke Wild (born 12 October 1967) is a former field hockey player from Germany, who was a member of the Women's National Team that won the silver medal at the 1992 Summer Olympics in Barcelona, Spain.

She was temporarily allied with the former field hockey player and Olympic gold medalist Andreas Keller, who is also the father of her two older children Felix and Luca.

References

External links
 

1967 births
Living people
German female field hockey players
Field hockey players at the 1992 Summer Olympics
Olympic field hockey players of Germany
Olympic silver medalists for Germany
Place of birth missing (living people)
Olympic medalists in field hockey
Medalists at the 1992 Summer Olympics
People from Rüsselsheim
Sportspeople from Darmstadt (region)
20th-century German women